Cuvântul Liber (Romanian for "The Free Word") was a Romanian political and cultural weekly published by Eugen Filotti from 1924 to 1925. Writers such as Ion Barbu, Victor Eftimiu and Tudor Arghezi or musicians, such as George Enescu or film critics such as the publisher's brother Mircea Filotti were among the contributors.

References
Cuvîntul liber (1919-1936) - Manuscriptum, 1971, Nr.3

Defunct literary magazines published in Europe
Defunct magazines published in Romania
Defunct political magazines
Magazines established in 1924
Magazines disestablished in 1925
Magazines published in Bucharest
Romanian-language magazines
Literary magazines published in Romania
Political magazines published in Romania
Weekly magazines published in Romania